The 1988–89 season was the 78th season in Hajduk Split’s history and their 43rd in the Yugoslav First League. Their 13th place finish in the 1987–88 season meant it was their 43rd successive season playing in the Yugoslav First League.

Competitions

Overall

Yugoslav First League

Classification

Results summary

Results by round

Matches

Yugoslav First League 

Sources: hajduk.hr

Yugoslav Cup 

Sources: hajduk.hr

Player seasonal records

Top scorers 

Source: Competitive matches

Notes 
1. Data for league attendance in most cases reflects the number of sold tickets and may not be indicative of the actual attendance.

See also 
 1988–89 Yugoslav First League
 1988–89 Yugoslav Cup

References

External sources 
 1988–89 Yugoslav First League at rsssf.com
 1988–89 Yugoslav Cup at rsssf.com

HNK Hajduk Split seasons
Hajduk Split